Sumer Passage (‘Protok Sumer’ \'pro-tok su-'mer\) is the 970 m wide passage in the Palmer Archipelago between Davis Island on the north and Albena Peninsula, Brabant Island on the south.  It connects Bouquet Bay and Gerlache Strait, another connection between the two being Zlogosh Passage.

The passage is named after the settlement of Sumer in Northwestern Bulgaria.

Location
British mapping in 1978.

Maps
 British Antarctic Territory. Scale 1:200000 topographic map. DOS 610 Series, Sheet W 64 62. Directorate of Overseas Surveys, UK, 1980.
 Antarctic Digital Database (ADD). Scale 1:250000 topographic map of Antarctica. Scientific Committee on Antarctic Research (SCAR). Since 1993, regularly upgraded and updated.

References
 Bulgarian Antarctic Gazetteer. Antarctic Place-names Commission. (details in Bulgarian, basic data in English)
 Sumer Passage. SCAR Composite Antarctic Gazetteer.

External links
 Sumer Passage. Copernix satellite image

Straits of the Palmer Archipelago
Bulgaria and the Antarctic